Agroecology and Sustainable Food Systems is a peer-reviewed scientific journal covering sustainable agriculture.  It was established in 1990 as the Journal of Sustainable Agriculture, obtaining its current title in 2013. It is published by Taylor & Francis and the editor-in-chief is Stephen R. Gliessman (University of California, Santa Cruz).

Abstracting and indexing
The journal is abstracted and indexed in the Science Citation Index Expanded and Scopus.

References

External links

Taylor & Francis academic journals
English-language journals
Publications established in 1990
Sustainable agriculture
Agricultural journals